Gabriel Carlsson (born 2 January 1997) is a Swedish professional ice hockey defenseman. He is currently playing with the  Washington Capitals of the National Hockey League (NHL).

He was considered one of the top ten international skaters for the 2015 NHL Entry Draft according to the NHL Central Scouting Bureau before he was selected 29th overall by the Columbus Blue Jackets.

Playing career 
Carlsson came through the youth ranks of Örebro HK, before joining the Linköpings HC youth system in 2013. He made his Swedish Hockey League (SHL) debut with Linköping's men's squad during the 2014–15 SHL season. After appearing in 10 post-season games, Carlsson was signed to a two-year contract extension to remain with Linköping on 17 April 2015. He made 45 appearances in the 2015–16 SHL season with one goal and eight assists. Carlsson also competed in six playoff contests with Linköping that year.

The Columbus Blue Jackets, who picked Carlsson in the 2015 NHL Entry Draft, announced on 19 April 2016 that he has signed a three-year entry level contract with the franchise.  He made his NHL debut at the end of the 2016–17 season and played in five Stanley Cup playoff games. On 15 October 2017, Carlsson was injured during a game against the New York Rangers and was subsequently placed on injured reserve.

Carlsson started the 2018–19 season with the Blue Jackets in the NHL, but was reassigned to the Cleveland Monsters on 10 October.

After six years within the Blue Jackets organization, Carlsson left as a free agent and was signed to a one-year, two-way contract with the Washington Capitals for the  season on 20 July 2022.

Career statistics

Regular season and playoffs

International

References

External links 
 

1997 births
Living people
Cleveland Monsters players
Columbus Blue Jackets draft picks
Columbus Blue Jackets players
Hershey Bears players
Linköping HC players
National Hockey League first-round draft picks
Swedish ice hockey defencemen
Sportspeople from Örebro
Washington Capitals players